Nanotragulus is an extinct genus of hypertragulid ruminant found in North America, Europe, and Asia. Fossils have been found from Oregon and Montana to Florida.

Nanotragulus was a primitive and ancient ruminant, resembling small deer or musk deer, although more closely related to the modern chevrotain. Its diet is stated to be that of a frugivore.

References

Eocene even-toed ungulates
Oligocene even-toed ungulates
Miocene even-toed ungulates
Burdigalian extinctions
Oligocene mammals of North America
Eocene genus first appearances
Prehistoric even-toed ungulate genera